Legislative elections were held in French Polynesia on 17 March 1991 for the Territorial Assembly. Gaston Flosse's Tahoera'a Huiraatira won 18 of 41 seats, and Alexandre Léontieff's Polynesian Union coalition won 14. The Aia Api party won five, and Tāvini Huiraʻatira four. 

Following the election Flosse formed a coalition with Émile Vernaudon's Aia Api and was elected President of French Polynesia. The coalition lasted only six months. In September 1991, Flosse fired two Aia Api ministers, and instead formed a coalition with Jean Juventin.

Results

References

French
Legislative
Elections in French Polynesia
Election and referendum articles with incomplete results